Percival Ball (17 February 1845 – 4 April 1900) was an English sculptor active in Australia.

Ball was born in Westminster, London, the son of Edward Henry Ball, carver, and his wife Louisa, née Percival. He later studied at the Royal Academy of Arts schools in England winning several gold medals and prizes. Between 1865 and 1882 he exhibited 24 works at Royal Academy exhibitions. Around 1870 Ball travelled to Paris and then to Munich and Rome, where he lived for approximately eight years. His marble sculptures received high praise.

Ball came to Sydney, Australia in 1884, seeking a warmer climate to relieve his asthma and bronchitis. After six months there he moved to Melbourne, occupying a studio at Grosvenor chambers from 1889 and completed the statue of Sir Redmond Barry which now stands in front of the public library in Melbourne, as a consequence of the original sculptor, James Gilbert, having died after modelling the statue in clay. Ball was then given other commissions, including the statue of Sir William Wallace at Ballarat; Francis Ormond at Melbourne, and some portrait busts, now in the national gallery at Melbourne. In 1886, he was commissioned to sculpt a marble bust of Bishop James Moorhouse, now at the La Trobe Library. In 1898 he was commissioned by the trustees of the national gallery at Sydney to design a panel for the facade of the building. He completed his relief panel Phryne before Praxiteles and then travelled to England to supervise the casting. His architectural sculpture is also at the Victoria and Albert Museum. He died of heart failure due to asthma and bronchitis in England in 1900.

References

External links
Bust of Amelia Ann Blanford Edwards by Percival Ball at the National Portrait Gallery, retrieved 2008-02-01
Works by Percival Ball at ArtNet.com, retrieved 2008-02-01

1845 births
1900 deaths
People from Westminster
Sculptors from London
English male sculptors
19th-century British sculptors